Black Summer is an American streaming television series created by Karl Schaefer and John Hyams. It is a spinoff of Z Nation. The first season, consisting of eight episodes, was released on Netflix on April 11, 2019. The series is produced by The Asylum, the same production company behind Z Nation, and is written and directed primarily by Hyams, with Abram Cox writing and directing additional episodes. Jaime King stars in the lead role as Rose, a mother who is separated from her daughter during the earliest and deadliest days of a zombie apocalypse. The series garnered moderate approval from critics. Many of the filming locations are around and within Calgary, Alberta.

In November 2019, Netflix renewed the series for an eight-episode second season, which was released on June 17, 2021.

Plot
Six weeks after the start of the zombie apocalypse, Rose (Jaime King) is separated from her daughter, Anna, and she embarks on a harrowing journey to find her. Thrust alongside a small group of refugees in North America, she must brave a hostile new world and make brutal decisions during the most deadly summer of the apocalypse.

Cast and characters

Main
 Jaime King as Rose, a mother who is separated from her daughter during the earliest and deadliest days of a zombie apocalypse
 Justin Chu Cary as Juliusz Jonski (season 1–2), a criminal who took the identity of "Spears", the name of the soldier he killed
 Christine Lee as Ooh "Sun" Kyungsun, a Korean woman who is looking for her missing mother
 Kelsey Flower as Lance (season 1; guest season 2), a young survivor with no family
 Sal Velez Jr as William Velez (season 1), a pole lineman who has a sister and children in Texas
 Erika Hau as Carmen (season 1), Manny's girlfriend
 Gwynyth Walsh as Barbara Watson (season 1), a woman who has survived without her husband and is not sure he is alive
 Mustafa Alabssi as Ryan (season 1), a deaf survivor
 Edsson Morales as Manny (season 1), Carmen's boyfriend
 Zoe Marlett as Anna (season 2; recurring season 1), Rose and Patrick's daughter

Recurring 
 Nyren B Evelyn as Earl (season 1), a mysterious survivor who saves Rose and Spears
 Stafford Perry as Phil (season 1), a social Darwinist travelling with Carmen and Manny
 Christian Fraser as Marvin (season 1), a man traveling with Carmen, Manny and Phil
 Nathaniel Arcand as Governale (season 1), a soldier
 Tom Carey as Bronk (season 1), a soldier
 Bobby Naderi as Ray Nazeri (season 2), a former police officer leading his own group
 Manuel Rodriguez-Saenz as Boone (season 2), a talkative man who knows the mountain area
 G. Michael Gray as Freddy (season 2), a man whose family encounters Rose and Anna
 Dakota Daulby as Sonny (season 2), Freddy's aggressive younger brother
 Brenda Robins as Freddy and Sonny's mother (season 2)
 Travis Friesen as Mark (season 2), a man in contact with a plane which drops supplies
 Kumiko Konishi as Rhonda (season 2), Mark’s wife
 Linda Kee as Sophie (season 2), a member of a group in conflict with Nazeri's group who later joins Nazeri
 Jesse Lipscombe as Mance (season 2), a member of Sophie's group
 Chantelle Han as Jase (season 2), a member of Sophie's group
 Elaine Yang as Natalie (season 2) a member of Sophie's group
 Duff Zayonce as Sam (season 2), a member of Nazeri's group who encounters Sophie's group
 Joe Perry as a member of Nazeri's group (season 2)
 Owen Crow Shoe as a member of Sophie's group (season 2)
 Andrew Misle, Cliff Liknes and John Dylan Louie (season 2) as members of another group which comes into conflict with Nazeri

Guest
 Ty Olsson as Patrick ("Human Flow" season 1), Rose's husband and Anna's father
 Lonni Olson as Ben ("Human Flow" season 1), a man who meets Barbara on the road
 David Haysom as Spears ("Human Flow" season 1), a soldier
 Bechir Sylvain as Braithwaite ("White Horse" season 2), a man who knew Spears before the apocalypse
 Daniel Diemer as Luke ("Cold War" season 2), an acquaintance of Sophie who encounters Lance
 James Yi as The Pilot ("The Plane" season 2), the pilot of the plane which drops supplies

Episodes

Season 1 (2019)

Season 2 (2021)

Connection to Z Nation
The connection between Black Summer and its parent series takes a similar approach as the original relationship between Fear the Walking Dead and The Walking Dead, as there are no plans for any of the characters from Z Nation to appear in the companion prequel series. Z Nation actor DJ Qualls revealed at San Diego Comic-Con that the Syfy series takes place "quite a long time" after the events of Black Summer, making him feel that the cast is "too old" for a crossover to work. The series do share "most to all of [their] writing, directing, and producing staff" as well as a production company, The Asylum. The show's starring actress, Jaime King, has said that the two series have "nothing to do with" each other.

Notes

References

External links
 

2010s American drama television series
2010s American horror television series
2020s American drama television series
2020s American horror television series
2019 American television series debuts
American action television series
American prequel television series
English-language Netflix original programming
Post-apocalyptic television series
Serial drama television series
Television shows filmed in Calgary
Zombies in television